Penn-ar-Bed is a French shipping company providing a ferry service between Finistère and the islands of Ushant, Molène and Sein every day of the year, under a public service contract to the Conseil général du Finistère. It is named after Penn-ar-Bed, the Breton name for Finistère. Its livery is blue and white.

Routes
The company operates the following routes:

 Brest - Le Conquet - Molène - Ushant
 Audierne - Ile de Sein
 Brest - Camaret-sur-Mer - Molène - Ushant (Seasonal)
 Brest - Camaret-sur-Mer - Ile de Sein (Seasonal)

Fleet
Pen-ar-Bed operate a fleet of seven vessels.

References

Ferry companies of France